Goniobranchus aureomarginatus is a species of colourful sea slug, a dorid nudibranch, a marine gastropod mollusc in the family Chromodorididae.

Distribution
This species was described from Auckland harbour and Waiwera, New Zealand. It is apparently a New Zealand endemic.

Description
This chromodorid nudibranch has a white mantle which is edged with yellow. The rhinophores and gills are translucent white with some opaque white pigment on the gill rachis and the rhinophore lamellae.

References

Chromodorididae
Molluscs of the Pacific Ocean
Gastropods of New Zealand
Endemic fauna of New Zealand
Gastropods described in 1881
Taxa named by Thomas Frederic Cheeseman